The 1998 California gubernatorial election was an election that occurred on November 3, 1998, resulting in the election of Lieutenant Governor Gray Davis as the state's first Democratic governor in 24 years. Davis won the general election by an almost 20% margin over his closest opponent, Republican Attorney General Dan Lungren. Davis succeeded Pete Wilson who was term limited.

The 1998 California gubernatorial election featured the state's only gubernatorial blanket primary, a practice which was later struck down in United States Supreme Court in California Democratic Party v. Jones in 2000. The primary occurred on June 2, 1998. Davis defeated fellow Democrats Jane Harman and Al Checchi for the Democratic nomination. Davis received more votes than Dan Lungren who ran against less well-known opponents in the Republican primary. The primary set a record for spending in a California gubernatorial primary.

Open primary
The Democratic field for the race became open when the state's most well-known and popular politician Dianne Feinstein decided in January 1998 not to run for Governor despite a request from President Bill Clinton.  She decided not to run in the race because of the difficulty of campaigning, the "deteriorated" nature of California statewide campaigns, and her desire to continue her work in the Senate.  Former White House  Chief of Staff Leon Panetta also decided not to run.

Al Checchi, a Democratic airline executive and political newcomer, was among the first to declare for the race.  Gray Davis also declared around the same time.  Congresswoman Jane Harman joined the contest in early April 1998.  In early polling the three candidates were within 12 points of each other, with Davis in last.  Harman spent $14.4 million in her race for Governor.  Checchi spent just under $39 million on his campaign.  The airline executive's campaign included numerous ads, one of which included school children trying to pronounce his name and another with his wife speaking Spanish.  Checchi did not identify himself as a Democrat in most of his early campaign
ads.
Harman briefly overtook Checchi in state polls but declined after Checchi launched a series of negative campaign ads against her.  Many of Feinstein's top campaign advisers worked for Harman during the Gubernatorial primary.  Harman's campaign ran a biographical ad of her at the 1960 Democratic National Convention.

Davis ran on the campaign slogan "experience money can't buy", and he promised to make education his top priority, which matched voters' concerns in exit polls.  All three major Democratic candidates made education one of their top priorities in the campaign.  Davis was third in polling until the final week of the campaign, and because he had trouble raising money during the early months of the campaign, he did not run campaign ads early in the race as did Harman and Checchi.  Davis spent 9 million in total campaign funds in the primary and later criticized Checchi for giving money to Republicans Steve Forbes and Bob Dole in 1996.

Lungren spent $7.7 million in the primary.  Davis finished first in the primary, followed by Lungren, Checchi, and Harman.

Candidates

Democrat 
 Gray Davis, incumbent lieutenant governor
 Jane Harman, U.S. Representative
 Al Checchi, businessman
 Chuck Pineda Jr.
 Pia Jensen
 Michael Palitz

Republican 
 Dan Lungren, incumbent attorney general
 Dennis Peron, businessman, veteran, and activist
 James D. Crawford
 Eduardo M. Rivera
 Jeff Williams

Green 
 Dan Hamburg, former U.S. Representative

Libertarian 
 Steve Kubby, businessman

Peace and Freedom 
 Gloria La Riva, activist and perennial candidate
 Marsha Feinland, perennial candidate

American Independent 
 Nathan E. Johnson

Natural Law 
 Harold H. Bloomfield, author

Primary results

General election
Gray Davis won the general election by almost 20% over Dan Lungren.  Davis outspent Lungren 28.6 million to 23.8 million.  Davis tried to portray Lungren as too conservative.  In one debate, Davis attacked Lungren for voting no on a Safe Drinking Water Bill in the 1980s while Lungren tried to cast himself as the political heir of former California Governor Ronald Reagan.   The policy differences between Davis and Lungren were substantial.  Davis was pro-abortion in a staunchly pro-abortion state,  and Lungren was anti-abortion.  Lungren favored giving children abstinence only education.  Both candidates were Roman Catholic. Al Gore, Bill Clinton, Hillary Clinton, and Bob Kerrey made campaign stops in California on Davis's behalf.  Davis succeeded in casting Lungren as too far right for California. Even normally conservative San Diego County went for Davis, and – foreshadowing their Democratic trends in the 21st century – the remote high mountain counties of  Alpine and Mono backed a Democratic Governor for the first time since before 1950. Upon his victory, Davis promised he would focus his attention on education and would convene a special session of the legislature.  The race determined who would control reapportionment of congressional districts after the 2000 census.

Results
Final results from the Secretary of State.

Results breakdown
Davis is the last Democratic gubernatorial nominee to have won Amador, Kings, Riverside, and Trinity Counties. Davis was the last Democrat until Jerry Brown in 2010 to carry Alpine, Del Norte, Sacramento, San Joaquin, and Santa Barbara Counties, the last until Jerry Brown in 2014 to carry Merced, Mono, San Diego, San Luis Obispo, Stanislaus, and Ventura Counties, and the last until Gavin Newsom in 2018 to carry San Bernardino County.

References

External links
 Official Results from California Secretary of State
 Official results by county
 Candidate Statements
 Candidate Statements – primaries
 California Journal Article

Gubernatorial
1998
California